Ignești is a commune in Arad County, Romania, is situated at the southern foot of Codru-Moma Mountains, in the Ineu-Gurahonț Basin. The commune stretches over 5192 hectares and is composed of four villages: Ignești (situated at 89 km from Arad), Minead (Menyéd), Nădălbești (Nádalmás) and Susani (Susányfalva).

Population
According to the 2002 census the population of the commune counts 822 inhabitants, out of which 99.4% are Romanians and 0.6% are Hungarians.

Istoric
The first documentary record of the locality Ignești dates back to 1553. The other settlements were attested documentary as it follows: Minead in 1619, Nadalbești in 1553 and Susani in 1574.

Economy
The economy of the commune is mainly agricultural, livestock-breeding and plant-growing being well represented. Apiculture
is also present on the economic map of the commune.

Tourism
Ignești commune can become an area with touristic attraction by trimming up its anthropic and natural potential.

References

Communes in Arad County
Localities in Crișana